The Albanian Fascist Party (or PFSh) was a fascist organisation active during World War II which held nominal power in Albania from 1939, when the country was invaded by Italy, until 1943, when Italy capitulated to the Allies. Afterwards, Albania fell under German occupation, and the PFSh was replaced by Balli Kombëtar.

History

Establishment
On 25 March 1939, Italian dictator Benito Mussolini gave Albanian King Zog I an ultimatum demanding the acceptance of an Italian military protectorate over Albania. When Zog refused to accept, the Italians invaded on 7 April and deposed him. Zog subsequently fled the country. Afterwards, the Italians re-established the Albanian state as a protectorate of the Kingdom of Italy.

On 11 April, Italian Minister of Foreign Affairs Galeazzo Ciano arranged for a group of well-known Albanians to "request" the formation of the Albanian Fascist Party (or PFSh). By the end of April, the government of Italy approved of its creation. On 23 April, Achille Starace, the Secretary of the National Fascist Party (or PNF), accompanied by two Regia Marina warships, arrived in Albania to officially announce the establishment of the PFSh, which was founded on 2 June. However, it did not receive its constitution until 6 June, and was not presented with an organised directorate and central council until March 1940.

Italian rule
The PFSh enacted laws that prevented Albanian Jews from joining it and excluded them from professions such as education. Composed of ethnic Albanians and Italians residing in Albania, the party existed as a branch of the PNF, and members were required to swear an oath of loyalty to Mussolini. All Albanians serving the Italian occupiers were required to join it, and it became the only legal political party in the country.

List of Ministers
Ministers Secretaries of the Albanian Fascist Party
 Tefik Mborja (1939–1941)
 Jup Kazazi (1941–1943)
 Kol Bib Mirakaj (1943)

Ministers Secretaries of the Guard of Great Albania
 Maliq Bushati (1943)
 Ekrem Libohova (1943)

"Geraca" (rank insignia) of the Albanian Fascist Party

See also
World War II in Albania
Albanian Lictor Youth
Albanian Fascist Militia

Notes

References

External links
States and Regents of the World: Albania

1939 establishments in Albania
1943 disestablishments in Albania
Albanian nationalist parties
Defunct political parties in Albania
Far-right political parties
Fascist parties
Italian Fascism
Italian protectorate of Albania (1939–1943)
Parties of one-party systems
Political parties disestablished in 1943
Political parties established in 1939
Politics of World War II